Frassino is a comune (municipality) in the Province of Cuneo in the Italian region Piedmont, located about  southwest of Turin and about  northwest of Cuneo.

Frassino borders the following municipalities: Brossasco, Melle, Sampeyre, and San Damiano Macra.

References 

Cities and towns in Piedmont